This page details the qualifying process for the 1984 African Cup of Nations in Ivory Coast. Ivory Coast, as hosts, and Ghana, as title holders, qualified automatically.

Qualifying tournament
 qualified as holders
 qualified as hosts

Preliminary round

|}

Malawi won 4–0 on aggregate.

Uganda won 4–3 on aggregate.

Rwanda won 1–0 on aggregate.

Angola won 6–2 on aggregate.

Mali won 3–2 on aggregate.

Senegal won 1–0 on aggregate.

Togo won 4–0 on aggregate.

Benin advanced after Liberia withdrew.

Mauritius advanced after Lesotho withdrew.

Mozambique advanced after Swaziland withdrew.

First round

|}

Cameroon won 4–3 on aggregate.

Algeria won 7–3 on aggregate.

Senegal won by away goals rule after 2–2 on aggregate.

Nigeria won 2–1 on aggregate.

Tunisia won 6–0 on aggregate.

Togo won 3–0 on aggregate.

Morocco won 4–2 on aggregate.

Sudan won 2–1 on aggregate.

Egypt won 3–1 on penalty shootout after 2–2 on aggregate.

Ethiopia won 4–2 on penalty shootout after 1–1 on aggregate.

Madagascar won by away goals rule after 2–2 on aggregate.

Malawi advanced after Zaire withdrew.

Second round

|}

Togo won 4–2 on aggregate.

Algeria won 3–1 on aggregate.

Egypt won 1–0 on aggregate.

Nigeria won 4–3 on penalty shootout after 0–0 on aggregate.

Cameroon won 5–2 on aggregate.

Malawi won 2–1 on aggregate.

Qualifying Teams

References

External links
CAN 1984 details – rsssf.com

Qual
1984
1984 African Cup of Nations